Spackenkill is a hamlet and census-designated place (CDP) in Dutchess County, New York, United States. The population was 4,123 at the 2010 census. It is part of the Poughkeepsie–Newburgh–Middletown, NY Metropolitan Statistical Area as well as the larger New York–Newark–Bridgeport, NY-NJ-CT-PA Combined Statistical Area.

Spackenkill is in the town of Poughkeepsie. Children in the community, if they attend public school, go to the Spackenkill Union Free School District. An IBM plant is also located in this community, and many of its employees live in Spackenkill. Several informal neighborhoods exist within the Spackenkill community such as Hagantown, Nassau, King George, Beechwood, Crown Heights, and Kingwood Park.  These neighborhoods contain some of the schools of the Spackenkill School District.

Geography
Spackenkill is located in the south-central part of the town of Poughkeepsie at  (41.6510, -73.9078). Neighboring communities include Crown Heights to the southwest and Red Oaks Mill to the east.

Demographics

As of the census of 2000, there were 4,756 people, 1,687 households, and 1,396 families residing in the CDP. The population density was 1,633.7 per square mile (631.0/km2). There were 1,729 housing units at an average density of 593.9/sq mi (229.4/km2). The racial makeup of the CDP was 56.90% White, 33.85% African American, 0.11% Native American, 6.67% Asian, 0.04% Pacific Islander, 1.09% from other races, and 1.35% from two or more races. Hispanic or Latino of any race were 4.98% of the population.

There were 1,687 households, out of which 37.7% had children under the age of 18 living with them, 74.5% were married couples living together, 6.2% had a female householder with no husband present, and 17.2% were non-families. 14.9% of all households were made up of individuals, and 8.5% had someone living alone who was 65 years of age or older. The average household size was 2.80 and the average family size was 3.10.

In the CDP, the population was spread out, with 27.2% under the age of 18, 4.6% from 18 to 24, 23.1% from 25 to 44, 28.8% from 45 to 64, and 16.2% who were 65 years of age or older. The median age was 42 years. For every 100 females, there were 96.9 males. For every 100 females age 18 and over, there were 93.8 males.

The median income for a household in the CDP was $77,689, and the median income for a family was $83,596. Males had a median income of $61,454 versus $41,349 for females. The per capita income for the CDP was $35,774. About 0.4% of families and 1.5% of the population were below the poverty line, including 0.8% of those under age 18 and none of those age 65 or over.

Transportation
The main arterial road through the area is U.S. Route 9, running north-south. New York State Route 113 runs east to Red Oaks Mill.

The nearest rail transportation is Amtrak and Metro North at Poughkeepsie station to the north and at New Hamburg station, to the south. Until 1952, the New York Central Railroad local trains from New York City to Poughkeepsie made stops at the Camelot station (5.3 miles south of Poughkeepsie Station), which was to the southwest of where the IBM campus is today and west of IBM Road.

Notable person
This area is home to professional poker player Hevad Khan.  Khan finished sixth in the Main Event of the 2007 World Series of Poker.

References

Poughkeepsie, New York
Census-designated places in New York (state)
Hamlets in New York (state)
Poughkeepsie–Newburgh–Middletown metropolitan area
Census-designated places in Dutchess County, New York
Hamlets in Dutchess County, New York